The Dr. Burdette and Myrna Gainsforth House, at 1300 East A St. in Ogallala, Nebraska, is a ranch style house that was built in 1949.  Also denoted as NeHBS no. KH00-096, it was listed on the National Register of Historic Places in 2002;  the listing included two contributing buildings and two contributing structures.

Designed by Dr. Burdette Gainsforth, the house was deemed significant as "a typical, and yet unique, example of an early 1950s ranch style residence."

References 

Houses on the National Register of Historic Places in Nebraska
Houses completed in 1949
Houses in Keith County, Nebraska
National Register of Historic Places in Keith County, Nebraska